Eugene Irving Anderson (October 5, 1917 – June 11, 1999) was an American professional basketball player. He played for the Akron Goodyear Wingfoots in the National Basketball League and averaged 4.6 points per game.

References

1917 births
1999 deaths
Akron Goodyear Wingfoots players
United States Navy personnel of World War II
American men's basketball players
Basketball players from Indiana
Forwards (basketball)
Guards (basketball)
People from Jackson County, Illinois
People from Franklin, Indiana
Purdue Boilermakers men's basketball players
Basketball players from Akron, Ohio